The Electric Reliability Council of Texas, Inc. (ERCOT) is an American organization that operates Texas's electrical grid, the Texas Interconnection, which supplies power to more than 25 million Texas customers and represents 90 percent of the state's electric load. ERCOT is the first independent system operator (ISO) in the United States. ERCOT works with the Texas Reliability Entity (TRE), one of eight regional entities within the North American Electric Reliability Corporation (NERC) that coordinate to improve reliability of the bulk power grid.

As the ISO for the region, ERCOT dispatches power on an electric grid that connects more than 46,500 miles of transmission lines and more than 610 generation units.

The United States Energy Information Administration Electric Power Monthly published the following detailed report regarding Texas's Net Generation by Energy Source: Total (All Sectors), 2010-December 2020, (Thousand Megawatthours), Table 1.1, for the Month of December 2020:
Coal: 78,700 MWh;
Petroleum Liquids: 909 MWh;
Petroleum Coke: 742 MWh;
Natural Gas:  125,704 MWh;
Other Gas: 972 MWh;
Nuclear:  69,871 MWh;
Hydroelectric Conventional:  23,086 MWh;
Solar: 5,381 MWh;
Renewable Sources Excluding Hydroelectric and Solar: 38,812 MWh;
Hydroelectric Pumped Storage: -368; 	
Other: 1,160 MWh.
 
According to an ERCOT report, the major sources of generating capacity in Texas are natural gas (51%), wind (24.8%), coal (13.4%), nuclear (4.9%), solar (3.8%), and hydroelectric or biomass-fired units (1.9%). ERCOT also performs financial settlements for the competitive wholesale bulk-power market and administers retail switching for 7 million premises in competitive choice areas.

ERCOT is a membership-based 501(c)(4) nonprofit corporation, and its members include consumers, electric cooperatives, generators, power marketers, retail electric providers, investor-owned electric utilities (transmission and distribution providers), and municipally owned electric utilities.

Power demand in the ERCOT region is typically highest in summer, primarily due to air conditioning use in homes and businesses. The ERCOT region's all-time record peak hour occurred on July 20, 2022, when consumer demand hit 79,828 MW. A megawatt of electricity can power about 200 Texas homes during periods of peak demand.

History
At the beginning of World War II, several electric utilities in Texas agreed to operate together as the Texas Interconnected System (TIS) to support the war effort. During the war, the grid was interconnected to other states and excess power generation was sent to industries on the Gulf Coast, providing a more reliable supply of electricity for production of metal and other material needed for the war.

Recognizing the reliability advantages of remaining interconnected, TIS members continued to operate and develop the interconnected grid. TIS members adopted official operating guides for their interconnected power system and established two monitoring centers within the control centers of two utilities, one in North Texas and one in South Texas.

In 1970, ERCOT was formed to comply with NERC requirements. However, the Texas grid is not subject to regulation under the Federal Power Act, being an intrastate grid for the purposes of that law. On May 4, 1976, Central Southwest Holdings attempted to force the issue, with an event that was later called the "Midnight Connection", where it connected the grid to Oklahoma for a few hours. This caused lawsuits about whether federal regulation then applied, however the judgement was that this was not sufficient.

The deregulation of the Texas electricity market occurred in two phases: the wholesale generation market in 1995 and the rest of the sector in 1999. The 1999 deregulation was aimed at counteracting a shortage of generation capacity in the state. Since deregulation, retail providers and power generators were unregulated, although regulations on transmitters continued to control the placement of electrical lines. The legislation abolished the former system, in which power was both generated and consumed locally. Instead, under the deregulated regime, retailers could contract with providers across the state, creating a complex market. The 1999 deregulation also dropped limits on rate increases. Prior to deregulation, residential electricity rates were significantly below the national average; after deregulation, residential electricity rates increased, rising 64% between 1999 and 2007.

2011 winter storm power losses
In early February 2011, a major winter storm impacted Texas; freezing and extreme cold at natural gas pipelines and wells, as well as generating units (such as coal-fired power plants and wind turbines) caused power outages across Texas affecting 3.2 million customers. ERCOT and its regulator, the Public Utility Commission of Texas, failed to adopt a mandatory standard for preparing electricity infrastructure for such occurrences (winterization), despite recommendations from the Federal Energy Regulatory Commission and North American Electric Reliability Corporation (NERC). Texas's failure to prepare left the state vulnerable to winter-storm blackouts, including the major disaster that occurred ten years later in February 2021.

2021 winter storm power losses

During a major cold-weather event in mid-February 2021, ERCOT declared a statewide emergency, due to a 34,000 MW shortfall in generation that caused widespread blackouts.  At 1:25 a.m. on February 15, ERCOT began requesting blackouts from service providers.  On February 16, electricity shortages caused the price of electricity to spike to over $9,000 per megawatt-hour (MWh), whereas the week before, the lowest price of power had been less than $30 a MWh.  Some retail electricity providers were possibly facing huge losses or bankruptcy, and customers of Griddy reported receiving absurdly high electric bills.

Approximately 4 million customers in Texas were without electricity for various times during the multi-day storm. At first, rotating outages lasting from 10 to 40 minutes were imposed on millions of customers, but those outages lasted many hours for some and over 48 hours for others, while millions more were spared from any hardship.

On February 16, Governor Greg Abbott declared that ERCOT reform would be an emergency priority for the state legislature, and there would be an investigation of the power outage to determine long-term solutions. A 357-page report had been written after the 2011 power outage in Texas, which seemed to have been ignored, because too many critical generators still lacked appropriate weatherization in 2021, especially the natural gas system.

Texans outside the ERCOT-controlled grid had a different power experience. Relatively few electric customers lost power in those regions. In counties around El Paso in western Texas, El Paso Electric reported that, as a result of it having investing millions in cold weather upgrades after the 2011 cold snap, 3,000 customers lost power for less than five minutes. In counties around Beaumont in eastern Texas, Entergy suffered relatively few outages either, because of previous winterization efforts.

The first lawsuits against ERCOT grid mismanagement were filed on February 19, 2021. On March 8, 2021, ERCOT began releasing a weekly market notice that includes entities that have paid previously identified short-pay amounts and provides an updated estimate of the aggregate outstanding short-pay amount.

On February 16, 2021, it was reported that at least 10 deaths were linked to the 2021 ERCOT grid power outages. By late March, the total number of deaths surpassed 110. A comprehensive review of news reports, death certificates, and lawsuit filings from every county in Texas led a team of journalists in Houston to set the death toll at 194, while a later review of excess deaths by journalists at BuzzFeed estimated the full indirect mortalities to be between 426 and 978. An 11-year-old boy, Cristian Pavon, who died of suspected hypothermia was among the deaths caused by ERCOT's grid system. Pavon's family sued Entergy Texas and ERCOT for gross negligence.

Bill Magness, CEO of ERCOT, was fired on March 4, 2021, for his role in the 2021 power loss incident. The board delivered a 60-day termination notice to Magness, who had been president and CEO since 2016. The board said he would serve in those roles for the next two months.

Governance
ERCOT is governed by a board of directors and subject to oversight by the Public Utility Commission of Texas (PUC) and the Texas Legislature.

The PUC has primary jurisdiction over activities conducted by ERCOT. Three PUC commissioners, including the chair, are appointed by the governor of Texas.

The ERCOT organization is governed by a board of directors made up of independent members, consumers and representatives from each of ERCOT's electric market segments.

The Technical Advisory Committee (TAC) makes policy recommendations to the ERCOT Board of Directors. The TAC is assisted by five standing subcommittees as well as numerous workgroups and task forces.

The ERCOT board appoints ERCOT's officers to direct and manage ERCOT's day-to-day operations, accompanied by a team of executives and managers responsible for critical components of ERCOT's operation.

During the February 2021 storm, it emerged that a third of ERCOT's board of directors live outside of Texas; this includes the chair Sally A. Talberg, who lives in Michigan, and the vice chair Peter Cramton. This revelation drew considerable anger from the public as well as elected representatives, and the board members' names and photographs were temporarily removed from the ERCOT website due to death threats. The board was also criticized for its meeting days before the storm: though the meeting lasted more than two hours, the members spent less than a minute discussing storm preparations and readiness. On February 23, ERCOT announced the resignation of five out-of-state board members effective the end of the board meeting the following day.

Organizational affairs
It has a headquarters in Austin and an additional complex in Taylor.

See also
 Deregulation of the Texas electricity market
 List of power stations in Texas
 Energy in Texas

Related Energy Entities
 Energy Information Administration (EIA)
 Federal Energy Regulatory Commission (FERC)
 North American Electric Reliability Corporation (NERC)
 Public Utility Commission of Texas (PUCT)
 Texas Reliability Entity (Texas RE)

References

Further reading
  357 pages.

External links
ERCOT website
Real-time price map
Real-time grid status
Assessing climate sensitivity of peak electricity load for resilient power systems planning and operation: A study applied to the Texas region

Electric power transmission system operators in the United States
1970 establishments in Texas
501(c)(4) nonprofit organizations
Energy in Texas